The Campeonato Brasileiro Série C 1994 was a football (soccer) series played from September 18 to December 9, 1994. It was the third level of the Brazilian National League. The competition had 42 clubs, and two of them were originally promoted to Série B.

First phase

Group 1

Group 2

Group 3

Group 4

Group 5

Group 6

Group 7

Group 8

Group 9

Group 10

Group 11

Second phase

Round of 16

Quarterfinals

Semifinals

Final

Novorizontino declared as the Campeonato Brasileiro Série C champions by aggregate score of 6-0.

Sources

Campeonato Brasileiro Série C seasons
1994 in Brazilian football leagues